Timaná is a town and municipality in the Huila Department, Colombia.

History 
The region of Timaná before the conquest in Colombia was inhabited by the Timana, bordered to the north by the Yalcón and farther north, the Paez and Pijao.
 
Modern Timaná was founded on December 18, 1538 by Pedro de Añasco, soldier in the army of Sebastián de Belalcázar.

References 

Municipalities of Huila Department
Populated places established in 1538
1538 establishments in the Spanish Empire